,  is a multinational insurance holding company headquartered in Tokyo, Japan. It is the largest property/casualty insurance group in Japan in terms of revenue and is the parent company for the Tokio Marine Group which employs 39,000 people in 38 countries worldwide.

The main business of Tokio Marine is Management of non-life insurance companies, life insurance companies, specialized securities companies, foreign companies engaged in insurance businesses and any other company which is or may become a subsidiary of the Company in accordance with the provisions of the Insurance Business Law of Japan, and any other business pertaining to the foregoing item.

Tokio Marine is part of Mitsubishi, one of the few Japanese giant conglomerates, known as keiretsu.

History

Founded in 1879 as Tokio Marine Insurance, it is the oldest insurance company in Japan. 
Millea Holdings was established in 2002 to become the parent company to Tokio Marine Insurance and Nichido Fire Insurance in preparation for their merger, before being renamed Tokio Marine Holdings in 2008.

Tokio Marine acquired the Philadelphia Insurance Companies for $4.7 billion in 2008, and acquired the Delphi Financial Group for $2.66 billion in 2012. In June 2015, Tokio Marine announced it would be acquiring HCC Insurance Holdings for $7.5 billion. Tokio Marine forecast that 46% of its profits would come from outside Japan following the HCC acquisition.

Since June 2019, Satoru Komiya has been the President and Group CEO. In October 2019, Tokio Marine Insurance announced it would buy insurer Pure Group for about $3.1 billion.

Controversies
Insure Our Future has described Tokio Marine’s environmental policy as “weak”. Unlike its competitor Sompo, Tokio Marine does not plan to stop insuring coal-fired power plants in Japan.

Holdings

Domestic Non-Life Insurance Business
Tokio Marine & Nichido Fire Insurance Co.
Nisshin Fire & Marine Co.
 E.design Insurance
 Tokio Marine Millea SAST
Domestic Life Insurance Business
Tokio Marine & Nichido Life Insurance Co.
Tokio Marine & Nichido Financial Life Insurance Co.
International Insurance Business
Tokio Marine HCC
Philadelphia Insurance Companies
Tokio Marine Asia - Regional HQ for Asia Pacific
First Insurance Company of Hawaii, Ltd.
Tokio Marine Kiln Group
 Delphi Financial Group
 Tokio Marine America
 Safety National
Other Non-Insurance Businesses
Tokio Marine Asset Management
Tokio Marine Technologies 
Tokio Marine & Nichido Career Service Co.
Millea Real-Estate-Risk Management
Tokio Marine & Nichido Facilities
Millea Mondial
Tokio Marine Nichido Samuel

References
 Tokio Marine Holdings - Annual Report 2011

External links

 Company website (in Japanese)
 Company website (in English)

 
Financial services companies established in 1879
Companies listed on the Tokyo Stock Exchange
Companies listed on the Osaka Exchange
Insurance companies based in Tokyo
Mitsubishi companies
Japanese companies established in 2002
Holding companies established in 2002
Japanese brands
Holding companies based in Tokyo